Mihajlo Zurković (born 1978) is a Serbian pianist who was born in Sombor and completed elementary music school there. By the age of 14 he obtained full scholarship to Serbian Academy of Sciences and Arts in Novi Sad and was under guidance from Jokuthon Mihailovic there. In 1995 in Belgrade he won Petar Konjović International Competition and then won European Piano Competition in Moncalieri the same year. Two years later he won International Chopin Piano Competition in Novi Sad and by 2002 became Dinu Lipatti Competition finalist in capital of Romania, Bucharest finishing with International Forum in Kyiv in 2009. The same year, he released his first CD which was produced by Laza Kostić and published by both the Sombor Cultural Centre and Serbian Academy of Arts. In 2012, he became an artistic director of SOMUS in his hometown and as of now works as assistant lecturer at the Academy of Arts of Novi Sad. Hismusic was featured on Vatican Radio, RTCG, and both Hungarian and Serbian National Televisions.

References

1978 births
Living people
Serbian pianists
Musicians from Sombor
21st-century pianists